Dylan Page (born 5 November 1993) is a Swiss former professional cyclist, who rode professionally between 2015 and 2019 for the , ,  and  teams.

Major results

2014
 8th Paris–Tours Espoirs
2015
 8th Tour de Vendée
 9th Trofeo Playa de Palma
2016
 3rd Trofeo Playa de Palma
2017
 6th Vuelta a La Rioja
2018 
 1st Stage 1 Tour de Indonesia
 5th Overall Tour of Mediterrennean
 5th Overall Tour de Siak

References

External links

 
 
 

1993 births
Living people
Swiss male cyclists